A falcon is a small to medium-sized bird of prey.

Falcon may also refer to:

Arts and entertainment

Film 
 Millennium Falcon, a fictional spaceship from the Star Wars films
 The Falcon (film), a 1981 Yugoslavian-German adventure film
 Falcons (film), a 2002 film starring Keith Carradine
 Banović Strahinja (film), English title The Falcon
 Falcon Entertainment, the parent corporation of a group of gay pornographic film studios
 Falcon Studios, a large company producing gay pornography, based in San Francisco
 Falcón (TV series), a 2012 television series produced by Sky Atlantic and based on the Robert Wilson novels

Fictional characters 
 Falcon (comics), a comic book superhero in the Marvel Universe
 The Falcon (fictional detective), a detective created by Michael Arlen in 1940
 The Falcon (radio series), a radio drama featuring the detective created by Drexel Drake in 1936
 Falcon (G.I. Joe), a fictional character in the G.I. Joe universe
 Falcon, a locomotive character, later renamed Sir Handel, in The Railway Series by Rev. W. Awdry
 Falcon from Stuart Little 2
 Blue Falcon, a superhero in the American animated television series Dynomutt, Dog Wonder
 Captain Falcon, a racer in the F-Zero video game series
 Edward Falcon, a character in the Power Stone series of video games

Music 
 An operatic voice type first exemplified by Cornélie Falcon
 Falcon Records (disambiguation)
 The Falcons, an American rhythm and blues band in the 1950s
 The Falcon (band), a Chicago punk rock band
 Falcon (album), by British alternative rock band The Courteeners
 Falcon (singer) (born 1984), stage name of Amanda Lindsey Cook

Video games 
 Falcon (video game series), a series of combat flight simulator computer games
 Novint Falcon, a USB haptic controller designed to replace the mouse in video games and other applications
 Falcon, a motherboard formerly included in all Xbox 360 console models

Businesses 
 Bryggeri AB Falken, a Swedish brewery which sold beer under the name Falcon
 Falcon, Battersea, a public house (pub) in Battersea, London
 The Falcon, Chester, a public house in Chester, England
 The Falcon, York, a public house in York, in England

Computing 
 Atari Falcon, Atari's last released general-use computer
 Falcon (storage engine), a MySQL storage engine
 Falcon (video game), a flight simulator video game
 Falcon Northwest, a high-end computer manufacturer in the US, specialising in gaming PCs
 A nickname for a PDP-11 model, the SBC 11/21 (boardname KXT11)
 Falcon, a hardware revision of Microsoft's Xbox 360 video game console
 Falcon (Signature), “Fast Fourier lattice-based compact signatures over NTRU”, a digital signature scheme

Military 
 AIM-4 Falcon, first operational guided air-to-air missile of the United States Air Force
 AIM-26 Falcon, a U.S. nuclear capable air-to-air missile
 AIM-47 Falcon, a U.S. long-range air-to-air missile
 AGM-76 Falcon, an experimental US high speed nuclear strike air-to-surface missile
 Curtiss Falcon a post-World War I observation biplane
 General Dynamics F-16 Fighting Falcon, a fighter aircraft
 , the name of 22 ships of the Royal Navy
 RAF Hal Far, an airfield on Malta called HMS Falcon while it was a Royal Navy base
 , the name of four ships of the United States Navy
 DARPA Falcon Project, a two-part joint project between the Defense Advanced Research Projects Agency and the United States Air Force
 Falcon Air Force Base, former name of Schriever Space Force Base, near Colorado Springs, Colorado, United States
 Joint Security Station Falcon, a former United States military forward operating base in Iraq
 Falcon Turret, a Jordanian main battle tank turret
 ZVI Falcon, a sniper rifle

People 
 Falcon (surname)
 Falcon Heene, the young boy involved in the balloon boy hoax of 2009
 Falcon Stuart (1941–2002), British photographer, retailer, filmmaker, manager and music producer

Places

United States 
 Falcon, Colorado, an unincorporated community
 Falcon, Kentucky
 Falcon, Mississippi
 Falcon, North Carolina
 Falcon, Tennessee
 Falcon Dam, Texas
 Falcon Village, Texas

Elsewhere 
 Falcon, Western Australia, a suburb of Mandurah, Australia
 Falcon Lake (disambiguation), various bodies of water in Canada, the U.S. and Mexico
 Falkenfelsen, or Falcon Rock, a granite formation in Germany

Schools 
 Falcon College, an all-boys independent boarding school in Esigodini, Zimbabwe
 Falcon High School, Falcon, Colorado, United States

School mascots 
 American Cooperative School of Tunis
 Bowling Green Falcons of Bowling Green University
 United States Air Force Academy
 Aplington–Parkersburg High School
 Clear Lake High School (Houston, Texas)
 Flowery Branch High School

Sports

Teams 
 Atlanta Falcons, an American National Football League team
 Falcons (rugby team), a South African rugby team
 Newcastle Falcons, a rugby union team based in Newcastle, England
 New Zealand national Australian rules football team, called the Falcons
 NIST International School Falcons, the sports teams of NIST International School in Bangkok, Thailand
 Polish Falcons of America, a Polish fraternal and sporting organization
 Sokół Nisko, literally "Falcon Nisko" in Polish
 Springfield Falcons, an American Hockey League team
 St. Catharines Falcons Jr. B, a Junior "B" hockey team based in St. Catharines, Ontario
 USA Falcons, a rugby union team that plays in the North America 4 tournament
 West Perth Football Club, West Perth WAFL team
 Winnipeg Falcons, an amateur ice hockey team which, representing Canada, won the first ever Olympic gold medal in ice hockey

Fields 
 Falcon Field (Corinth, Texas), a baseball field 
 Falcon Field (Meriden, Connecticut), a football field
 Falcon Baseball Field, in Colorado Springs, Colorado

Transport

Aviation 
 Buckeye Falcon, an American powered parachute design
 Dassault Falcon, a family of business jets manufactured by Dassault Aviation
 Dassault Falcon 900 , a French-built corporate trijet aircraft made by Dassault Aviation
 Falcon Air, a defunct Swedish airline
 Falcon Air Express, a defunct airline based in Miami, Florida
 Falcon Express Cargo Airlines, an airline based in the United Arab Emirates
 Hansjörg Streifeneder Falcon, a German sailplane
 Miles Falcon, a 1930s British three/four-seat cabin monoplane
 Rolls-Royce Falcon, a World War I-era aircraft engine
 Wills Wing Falcon, an American hang glider design
 Falcon Field (Arizona), an airport
 Atlanta Regional Airport, also known as Falcon Field, a public use airport in Fayette County, Georgia, United States

Maritime 
 Falcon, a ship of the Third Supply fleet to Virginia colony in 1609
 Falcon, a small sailing vessel used by Edward Frederick Knight to explore the Baltic
 , a steamship built in 1945 as Sasbeck, and named Falcon 1968–69.

Rail 
 British Rail Class 53 Falcon, a class of lightweight electric-diesel locomotives made in 1961
 Falcon, a South Devon Railway Comet class 4-4-0ST steam locomotive involved in a crash

Road 
 Dennis Falcon, a bus model manufactured by Dennis Specialist Vehicles
 Falcon Cycles, a British bicycle manufacturer
 Falcon Shells, a British automobile manufacturer
 Falcon Motorsports, an American manufacturer of high performance automobiles
 Chrysler Falcon, a concept sports car made by Chrysler
 Ford Falcon (Argentina), a compact car built by the Ford Motor Company of Argentina
 Ford Falcon (Australia), a full-size car manufactured by the Ford Motor Company of Australia
 Ford Falcon (XK)
 Ford Falcon (XL)
 Ford Falcon (XM)
 Ford Falcon (XP)
 Ford Falcon (XR)
 Ford Falcon (XT)
 Ford Falcon (XW)
 Ford Falcon (XY)
 Ford Falcon (XA)
 Ford Falcon (XB)
 Ford Falcon (XC)
 Ford Falcon (XD)
 Ford Falcon (XE)
 Ford Falcon (XF)
 Ford Falcon (XG)
 Ford Falcon (XH)
 Ford Falcon (EA)
 Ford Falcon (EB)
 Ford Falcon (ED)
 Ford Falcon (EF)
 Ford Falcon (EL)
 Ford Falcon (AU)
 Ford Falcon (BA)
 Ford Falcon (BF)
 Ford Falcon (FG)
 Ford Falcon (FG X)
 Ford Falcon (North America), a compact car produced by Ford Motor Company 
 Ford Falcon van, a passenger van produced by the Ford Motor Company in the 1960s

Rocketry and space 
 Falcon 1, a SpaceX launch vehicle
 Falcon 5, a proposed partially reusable launch vehicle designed by SpaceX
 Falcon 9, a partially reusable launch vehicle produced by SpaceX
 Falcon Heavy, a partially reusable launch vehicle produced by SpaceX
 "Falcon", the callsign of the Apollo 15 Lunar Module
 Viper Falcon, a U.S. sounding rocket
 The Falcon Project, a U.K. and U.S. rocket company by Daniel Jubb

Other uses 
 Operation FALCON, several dragnets for fugitives organized by the United States Marshals Service
 Typhoon Falcon (disambiguation)
 FALCON (cable system), a submarine communications cable connecting several countries in the Persian Gulf and India
 Falcon (Duinrell), a Gerstlauer Eurofighter model roller coaster at Duinrell amusement park

See also 

 Falcón (disambiguation)
 Falkon, a web browser
 Falcon Heights (disambiguation)
 Falcone (disambiguation)
 Falcones (disambiguation)
 Falcons (disambiguation)
 Falken Tires, a subsidiary of Sumitomo
 Pakistan national cricket team, nicknamed the "Shaheens" in Urdu, meaning the "Falcons"